The 1968–69 FIBA European Champions Cup was the twelfth installment of the European top-tier level professional basketball club competition FIBA European Champions Cup (now called EuroLeague). The Final was held at Palau dels Esports, in Barcelona, Catalonia, Spain, on April 24, 1969, and it was won by CSKA Moscow, who defeated Real Madrid 103–99.

Competition system
25 teams (European national domestic league champions, plus the then current title holders), playing in a tournament system, played knock-out rounds on a home and away basis. The aggregate score of both games decided the winner.
The eight teams qualified for 1/4 Finals were divided into two groups of four. Every team played against the other three in its group in consecutive home-and-away matches, so that every two of these games counted as a single win or defeat (point difference being a decisive factor there). In case of a tie between two or more teams after the group stage, the following criteria were used to decide the final standings: 1) one-to-one games between the teams; 2) basket average; 3) individual wins and defeats.
The group winners and runners-up of the 1/4 Finals round qualified for 1/2 Finals. The final was played at a predetermined venue.

First round

|}

Second round

|}

Quarterfinals group stage
The quarterfinals were played with a round-robin system, in which every Two Game series (TGS) constituted as one game for the record.

Semifinals

|}

Final
April 24, Palau dels Esports de Barcelona, Barcelona

|}

Awards

FIBA European Champions Cup Finals Top Scorer
 Vladimir Andreev ( CSKA Moscow)

External links
 1968–69 FIBA European Champions Cup
 1968–69 FIBA European Champions Cup
 Game Details of Real Madrid
 Champions Cup 1968–69 Line-ups and Stats

EuroLeague seasons
FIBA